The Nanny Reunion: A Nosh to Remember is a 2004 American television special that reunited the cast of the 1993–1999 sitcom The Nanny. It originally aired on Lifetime on 6 December 2004.

Synopsis
The cast members reminisce about the show and present exclusive blooper footage never shown on television, as well as an update on their current activities.

The reunion took place at Fran Drescher's oceanside home in California.  The entire cast was present except for Daniel Davis, who was performing in the musical La Cage aux Folles on Broadway at the time and was unable to attend.  Also at the reunion were Drescher's mother and father, Sylvia and Morty, who made several appearances on the show.

In the special, Daniel Davis, or "Danny", was said by Drescher to have gotten "lost". At the end of the special, "Danny" (actually Danny Bonaduce), makes an appearance.

Cast (in order of appearance)
Fran Drescher
Renée Taylor
Steve Lawrence
Charles Shaughnessy
Lauren Lane
Rachel Chagall
Ann Morgan Guilbert
Daniel Davis (cameo; flashback only)
Nicholle Tom
Madeline Zima
Benjamin Salisbury

Special guest
Danny Bonaduce

References

External links
 

2004 television specials
2000s American television specials
The Nanny
Television series reunion specials